Laguna Mariñaqui is a volcano in the Malleco Province of the Chilean Andes.

Cerro Chapulul is an associated cinder cone that was formed during the Holocene.

The stratovolcanoes of Copahue and Tolguaca respectively lie to the north and south-southwest of the Laguna Mariñaqui system.

References 

Volcanic fields
Volcanoes of Araucanía Region
Holocene volcanism